Balanus nubilus, commonly called the giant acorn barnacle, is the world's largest barnacle, reaching a diameter of  and a height of up to , and containing the largest known muscle fibres.

Balanus nubilus is a northeast Pacific species that ranges from southern Alaska to Baja California. Like other acorn barnacles, B. nubilus is a filter feeder; it, in turn, is sometimes eaten by sea otters, sea stars, crabs and the Native Americans of the Pacific Northwest. Abandoned shells of B. nubilus are used by the crab Glebocarcinus oregonensis for shelter.

References

Barnacles
Crustaceans of the eastern Pacific Ocean
Crustaceans described in 1854
Taxa named by Charles Darwin